Monica Tabengwa is a lawyer and researcher from Botswana who works for Pan-Africa ILGA and Human Rights Watch (HRW). She is a specialist on LGBT issues in sub-Saharan Africa. Tabengwa has written on violence and discrimination faced by LGBT people in sub-Saharan Africa.

Tabengwa is a member of the drafting committee and a signatory of the Yogyakarta Principles plus 10.

Selected bibliography

References 

Botswana women
Botswana human rights activists
Living people
Year of birth missing (living people)
Botswana LGBT rights activists
Botswana LGBT people